Kord Mahalleh (also Romanized as Kord Maḩalleh; also known as Maḩmūd Kīā) is a village in Taher Gurab Rural District, in the Central District of Sowme'eh Sara County, Gilan Province, Iran. At the 2006 census, its population was 351, in 102 families.

References 

Populated places in Sowme'eh Sara County